The Kerava National Cricket Ground is a cricket ground in Kerava, Finland, home to the Kerava Cricket Club. The ground was opened in June 2014, in the presence of England Test cricketer Mike Brearley and Lord Mervyn King. In February 2019, it was announced that the venue would host three Twenty20 International (T20I) matches in August 2019, between Finland and Spain. Kerava National Cricket Ground is the northernmost cricket ground in the world which has hosted a T20 International match.

References

Cricket grounds in Finland
Cricket in Finland
Multi-purpose stadiums in Finland
Sports venues completed in 2014
2014 establishments in Finland